Yville-sur-Seine (literally Yville on Seine) is a commune in the Seine-Maritime department in the Normandy region in north-western France.

Geography

Population

Places of interest
 A fifteenth-century timber constructed manoir.
 A stone cross from the thirteenth century.
 The church of St. Léger, dating from the twelfth century.
 The eighteenth-century château of Yville, a privately owned historical monument. The magnificent gardens and grounds include a collection of holly (ilex sp.), box (buxus), lilac (syringa) and roses. It was built by Jean-Jacques Martinet, from plans attributed to Jules Hardouin Mansart.

See also
Communes of the Seine-Maritime department

References

External links

Website of the Château d'Yville

Communes of Seine-Maritime